The men's 10,000 metres event at the 1999 Summer Universiade was held on 12 July 1999 at the Estadio Son Moix in Palma de Mallorca, Spain.

Results

References

Athletics at the 1999 Summer Universiade
1999